Omar Arjoune is a Moroccan professional footballer who plays for Saudi Arabian club Al-Faisaly.

Career
On 31 July 2022, Arjoune joined Saudi Arabian club Al-Faisaly on a one-year deal with the option to extend for another.

Honours
IR Tanger 
Moroccan League : 2018

Raja Casablanca
Moroccan League : 2020
Confederation Cup : 2021

References

1996 births
Living people
Footballers from Casablanca
Moroccan footballers
Raja CA players
RS Berkane players
Ittihad Tanger players
Al-Faisaly FC players
Saudi First Division League players
Moroccan expatriate footballers
Moroccan expatriate sportspeople in Saudi Arabia
Expatriate footballers in Saudi Arabia
Association football midfielders